Peter Berck (April 26, 1950 – August 10, 2018) was an American economist.

Berck studied mathematics and economics at the University of California, Berkeley, and completed a doctorate in economics from the Massachusetts Institute of Technology in 1976. Berck returned to Berkeley as a faculty member and was named the S.J. Hall Professor of Forest Economics.

Background
Berck grew up in New York, attended UC Berkeley, and earned a PhD in economics from MIT. Returning to Berkeley, he spent his academic career of nearly 42 years in UC Berkeley's Department of Agricultural & Resource Economics, College of Natural Resources.

Berck was an environmental economist focusing on farming, forests, fisheries, pollution, and energy.

References

1950 births
2018 deaths
MIT School of Humanities, Arts, and Social Sciences alumni
UC Berkeley College of Letters and Science alumni
University of California, Berkeley College of Natural Resources faculty
American economists
Agricultural economists
Environmental economists